This is a list of notable manufacturing companies of Bangladesh.

A
 Akij Group
 Alim Industries Limited

B
 Bangladesh Machine Tools Factory
 BEXIMCO
 BSRM
 Bengal Group of Industries
 British American Tobacco, Bangladesh

C

 Chittagong Dry Dock Limited
 Confidence Group

G

 Globe Janakantha Shilpa Paribar

H

 Habib Group

K

 KDS Group

M

 Meghna Group

P

 Pragoti

S

 Sikder Group

T

 T K Group of Industries

U

 Unilever Bangladesh Limited

References

Manufacturing